Stanislav Škorvánek (born 31 January 1996) is a Slovak professional ice hockey goaltender currently playing for HK Dukla Michalovce of the Slovak Extraliga.

Career statistics

Regular season and playoffs

References

External links

 

Living people
1996 births
Slovak ice hockey goaltenders
HC Nové Zámky players
HK Trnava players
HC 07 Detva players
HC Košice players
HC Prešov players
HK Dukla Michalovce players
MsHK Žilina players
Sportspeople from Žilina